Virgibacillus flavescens is a Gram-variable, rod-shaped-forming, and motile bacterium from the genus of Virgibacillus which has been isolated from marine sediments from the Yellow Sea in China.

References

Bacillaceae
Bacteria described in 2016